Amy B. Jordan is an American astronomer and a discoverer of minor planets who works at the University of Colorado.

Career 
In 2002 she was part of the team which discovered , a resonant Kuiper belt object at the Cerro Tololo Inter-American Observatory, Chile. She also co-discovered two main-belt asteroids. In 2005, she was a teaching assistant at the Summer Science Program, which teaches astronomy to high school students using a curriculum based on observing and calculating orbits of asteroids.

List of discovered minor planets

See also

Publications 
 Chiang, EI, Jordan, AB, (2002). On the Plutinos and Twotinos of the Kuiper belt.
 Chiang, EI, Jordan, AB, Millis, RL et al. (2003). Resonance occupation in the Kuiper belt: Case examples of the 5: 2 and Trojan resonances.

References

External links 
 List Of Centaurs and Scattered-Disk Objects, Minor Planet Center

American women astronomers
Discoverers of minor planets
Living people
Summer Science Program
University of Colorado faculty
Year of birth missing (living people)